The 1993 Orlando Predators season was the 3rd season for the franchise. They went 10-2 and lost in the AFL semi-finals to the Tampa Bay Storm.

Regular season

Schedule

Standings

z – clinched homefield advantage

y – clinched division title

x – clinched playoff spot

Playoffs

Roster

Awards

References

links

1993 Arena Football League season
Orlando Predators seasons
1993 in sports in Florida
1990s in Orlando, Florida